The Russian Basketball Cup is the primary professional national domestic basketball cup competition of Russia.

History
After the cease of the USSR Basketball Cup in 1987, the Russian Federation did not launch any Cup competition in the following years despite the fact that the Russian Basketball Super League 1 had started in 1992.
The first cup tournament took place in the year 2000 with the Final Four being hosted at Sochi. It was not held in the following two seasons, but it returned in 2002. Starting from the 2014-15 season most of the VTB League clubs withdrew as the Russian Federation did not allow the use of foreign players in the competition resulting in only 3 VTB teams (Khimki, Krasnye Krylia and Krasny Oktyabr) participating. BC UNICS was the last club from the VTB League to win the trophy in 2014. The last two seasons (2020-22) no VTB club applied to participate in the competition as normally two or three teams would join annually. Current holders are BC Samara.

Final Fours

Performance by club

See also
Basketball in Russia 
Russian Professional Championship
VTB United League
Russian Professional League
Russian Super League 1
USSR Premier League
USSR Cup

References

External links
 Russian Basketball Federation Official Site 

 
Basketball cup competitions in Europe
Cup
2000 establishments in Russia